Ammuvagiya Naan is a 2007 Indian Tamil-language drama film directed by Padmamagan starring R. Parthiepan and Bharathi. The music was compose by Sabesh–Murali. The film released in September 2007 and became a hit.

Plot
The film revolves around Ammu (Bharathi), an orphan brought up in a prostitute's house. Brought up in such atmosphere, she develops a fascination for the world's oldest profession. She comes across a writer Gowrishankar (R. Parthiepan), who comes to her place to pen a novel on the life of a commercial sex worker. Her childlike innocence wins over Gowrishankar's heart. He decides to marry her. Gowrishankar's love and care brings a change in Ammu. She understands the value of family and the bond of togetherness. Gowrishankar completes his novel Ammuvagya Naan and hopes for a national award for it. Fate pays a cruel act in the form of a president of a literary association (Mahadevan). He bargains for a night with Ammu to ensure the national award for Amuvagiya Naan. Eventually, Ammu kills the president.

Cast
R. Parthiepan as Gowrishankar
Bharathi as Ammu
Mahadevan as Nathan, Literary Association President
Sadhana as Rani
Ragasudha as Malli
Thennavan as Mohan
Abhishek Shankar as Raghu
Shanthi Williams as Gowrishankar's sister
Suja Varunee as Special appearance

Soundtrack
Soundtrack was composed by Sabesh–Murali.
"Kadale Kadale" - Mathangi
"Kadale Kadale" (2) - Sabesh Murali
"Silir Silir" - Srilekha Parthasarathy
"Unnai Saranadainthen" - Harish Raghavendra, Kalyani

Critical reception
Kollywood Today wrote "As a whole, Ammuvaagiya Naan is a film that has attempted to can a bold theme with different approach and thank god, there are no unwanted commercial elements present here."

References

2007 films
2000s Tamil-language films
Indian drama films
Films about prostitution in India